Alexander Olegovich Burmistrov (Russian: Александр Олегович Бурмистров, ; born 21 October 1991) is a Russian professional ice hockey centre currently playing for Metallurg Magnitogorsk of the Kontinental Hockey League (KHL). He previously played in the National Hockey League (NHL) for the Atlanta Thrashers/Winnipeg Jets franchise as well as the Arizona Coyotes, before leaving the NHL after a short stint with the Vancouver Canucks. Burmistrov won the Gagarin Cup with Ak Bars Kazan in 2018.

Playing career

Junior
Burmistrov joined the Ontario Hockey League (OHL)'s Barrie Colts after being selected 12th overall in the 2009 CHL Import Draft. He made his debut in North America on 17 September 2009 against the Owen Sound Attack, recording his first career OHL goal in his debut.

Professional

Atlanta Thrashers/Winnipeg Jets
Having been drafted into the NHL by the Atlanta Thrashers eighth overall at the 2010 NHL Entry Draft, on 8 October 2010, Burmistrov made his NHL debut with Atlanta in a game against the Washington Capitals. On 29 October, in a game against the Buffalo Sabres, he scored his first career NHL goal. He then engaged in his first career NHL fight on 11 December against John Tavares of the New York Islanders.

During the 2011–12 season, Burmistrov would score 13 goals with 15 assists during for the newly relocated Winnipeg Jets. At the onset of the 2012–13 NHL lockout, Burmistrov was assigned to Winnipeg's American Hockey League (AHL) affiliate, the St. John's IceCaps, where he would record 2 goals and 9 assists (11 points) in 22 games before being recalled to Winnipeg for the start of the shortened 2012–13 season.

Ak Bars Kazan
At season's end, Burmistrov became a restricted free agent and subsequently signed a two-year contract with Ak Bars Kazan of the Kontinental Hockey League (KHL). He explained in interviews that his departure from the NHL was motivated by dissatisfaction with his role under Jets head coach Claude Noël as well as bitterness over being assigned to the AHL rather than being allowed to pursue a more lucrative offer in Russia during the NHL lockout.

Return to Winnipeg
On 1 July 2015, the opening day of the NHL free agency period, Burmistrov signed a two-year contract to return to Winnipeg.

Arizona Coyotes
In a disappointing start to the 2016–17 season in which he scored only 2 points in 23 games with Winnipeg, Burmistrov was placed on waivers on 1 January 2017 and was subsequently claimed by the Arizona Coyotes. He recorded 5 goals and 14 points in 26 games with the Coyotes.

Vancouver Canucks and NHL retirement
On 1 July 2017, as a free agent, Burmistrov signed a one-year, $900,000 contract with the Vancouver Canucks. He was used in a limited role and received minimal playing time with the Canucks.  On 24 December 2017, his agent, Dan Milstein, released a statement on Twitter that stated Burmistrov had "retired from the NHL" and that an announcement on his future was forthcoming. The wording of Milstein's tweet has fueled speculation that Burmistrov would return to the KHL once his retirement paperwork with the NHL was completed.

Return to KHL
Three days after his retirement tweet was sent out, Burmistrov returned to the KHL, signing with former club Ak Bars Kazan. In joining Ak Bars through the push for the playoffs in the 2017–18 season, Burmistrov added depth to the offence, contributing with 6 points in 10 games. He made 17 playoff appearances and scored 3 points to help Ak Bars claim the Gagarin Cup.

On 6 June 2018, Burmistrov signed a two-year contract extension with Ak Bars. During the 2018–19 season, Burmistrov struggled to gain his offensive touch, registering just 5 points in 27 games for the defending champions before he was traded to Salavat Yulaev Ufa in exchange for three prospects on 1 December 2018.

Burmistrov remained with Salavat through the 2019–20 season, notching 6 goals and 18 points in 58 games in a checking-line role. He added a goal and assist in Salavat's opening round victory over Avangard Omsk before the remainder of playoffs were cancelled due to the COVID-19 pandemic.

As a free agent, Burmistrov returned home to Ak Bars Kazan, agreeing to a one-year contract for his fourth stint with the club on 5 June 2020.

International play

Burmistrov represented Russia at the 2010 World Junior Championships held in Saskatchewan. He was named to the Russian senior team for competition at the 2014 IIHF World Championship.

Career statistics

Regular season and playoffs

International

Awards and honours

References

External links
 
 Alexander Burmistrov at RussianProspects.com

1991 births
Living people
Ak Bars Kazan players
Arizona Coyotes players
Atlanta Thrashers draft picks
Atlanta Thrashers players
Barrie Colts players
Metallurg Magnitogorsk players
National Hockey League first-round draft picks
Russian ice hockey centres
St. John's IceCaps players
Salavat Yulaev Ufa players
Sportspeople from Kazan
Vancouver Canucks players
Winnipeg Jets players